The 2014 Minnesota State Auditor election was held on November 4, 2014, to elect the Minnesota State Auditor.

Incumbent Democratic–Farmer–Labor State Auditor Rebecca Otto ran for re-election to a third term in office. Primary elections were held on August 12, 2014. The Democratic–Farmer–Labor Party (DFL) renominated Otto, the Republican Party nominated former Long Lake Mayor Randy Gilbert and the Independence Party nominated business owner Pat Dean.

Otto defeated Gilbert in the general election by a significant margin.

Democratic–Farmer–Labor primary
The Democratic–Farmer–Labor endorsement was made on May 31, 2014. Incumbent Rebecca Otto won the endorsement unopposed.

Former Minority Leader of the Minnesota House of Representatives Matt Entenza filed to run on June 3, 2014, less than an hour before the filing deadline. His surprise entrance into the race encountered criticism from prominent DFLers.

Candidates

Declared
 Matt Entenza, former Minority Leader of the Minnesota House of Representatives and candidate for Governor in 2010
 Rebecca Otto, incumbent State Auditor (party endorsed)

Results

Republican primary
The Republican endorsement was made on May 30, 2014. Former Mayor of Long Lake Randy Gilbert, who was a candidate for State Auditor in 2010, won the endorsement unopposed.

Candidates

Nominee
 Randy Gilbert, former Mayor of Long Lake and candidate for State Auditor in 2010 (party endorsed)

Results

Independence primary
The Independence Party endorsement was made on May 17, 2014. Pat Dean won the endorsement unopposed.

Candidates

Nominee
 Pat Dean, business owner (party endorsed)

Results

General election

Candidates
 Rebecca Otto (DFL), incumbent State Auditor
 Randy Gilbert (Republican), former Mayor of Long Lake and candidate for State Auditor in 2010
 Pat Dean (Independence), business owner
 Judith Schwartzbacker (Grassroots-Legalize Cannabis)
 Keegan Iversen (Libertarian), former member of the Minnesota Air National Guard and Iraq War veteran

Results

See also
 Minnesota elections, 2014

References

External links
 Elections & Voting - Minnesota Secretary of State

2014 Minnesota elections
Minnesota State Auditor elections
November 2014 events in the United States
Minnesota